"Everything Is Everything" is a song by French rock band Phoenix and is featured on their second studio album, Alphabetical. It was released 22 March 2004 in the European Union and Japan as the lead single from that album. It was also released 12 July 2004 as a single from the album in the United Kingdom. It is featured in the music video game Guitar Hero On Tour: Decades, as downloadable content for Guitar Hero 5, and on Six Feet Under, Vol. 2: Everything Ends.

Track listings

Europe
Maxi-CD
"Everything Is Everything"
"I'm an Actor"
"Everything Is Everything" (instrumental)
"Everything Is Everything" (home demo)

UK
7" SOUR097, CD SOURCD097
"Everything Is Everything"
"Victim of the Crime"
Maxi-CD SOURCDX097
"Everything Is Everything"
"Run Run Run" (SBN Session)
"The Diary of Alphabetical" (early demos)
"Everything Is Everything" (studio video)

Charts

References

2004 singles
2004 songs
Phoenix (band) songs
Music videos directed by Roman Coppola
Songs written by Thomas Mars
Songs written by Laurent Brancowitz
Song recordings produced by Tony Hoffer